{{Infobox airport 
| name         = PAF Base Mushaf
| nativename   = 
| nativename-a = 
| nativename-r = 
| image        = File:PAF Base Mushaf 1.jpg
| image-width  = 250
| caption      = Logo of PAF Base Mushaf
| IATA         = MSF
| ICAO         = OPSR
| type         = Military
| owner        = Ministry of Defence (Pakistan)
| operator     = Pakistan Air Force
| city-served  = 
| location     = Sargodha, Punjab, Pakistan
| hub          =
| built        = 
| used         = 
| commander    =  
Air Commodore
''Noori
| occupants    = Pakistan Air Force
 No. 9 Squadron "Griffins"

 No. 23 Squadron CCS F-7PG "Talons"

 No. 24 Squadron "Blinders"

 No. 29 Squadron CCS F-16 "Aggressors"

 CCS Mirage "Sky Bolts"

 CCS JF-17 "Fierce Dragons"

 No. 82 Squadron "Stallions"
| elevation-f  = 614
| elevation-m  = 187
| coordinates  = 
| website      = 
| metric-elev  = 
| metric-rwy   = 
| r1-number    = 06/24
| r1-length-f  = 7,956
| r1-length-m  = 2,424
| r1-surface   = Asphalt
| r2-number    = 14/32
| r2-length-f  = 10,253
| r2-length-m  = 3,124
| r2-surface   = Asphalt
| stat-year    = 
| stat1-header = 
| stat1-data   = 
| stat2-header = 
| stat2-data   = 
| footnotes    = 
}}PAF Base Mushaf (formerly PAF Base Sargodha''')), is a Pakistan Air Force (PAF) airbase situated at Sargodha in the Punjab province of Pakistan. It is designated as a "Major Operational Base" or "MOB" by the PAF. 

It was known as PAF Base Sargodha until 2003, when it was renamed in honour of the former Base Commander and Chief of the Air Staff Air Chief Marshal Mushaf Ali Mir, whose aircraft crashed on a routine flight near Kohat in February 2003.

The PAF's Central Air Command (CAC), the Combat Commanders' School (CCS), and the PAF Airpower Centre of Excellence (PAF ACE) are based at PAF Base Mushaf, PAF Base Mushaf is the most elite and widely operational base in Pakistan, consisting of the highest equipped aircraft and squadrons and the best trained pilots and commanders.

Incidents
On 1 November 2007, a suicide bomber struck the 50-seat bus carrying PAF officers to nearby Kirana Ammunition Depot, killing 11 people (including 7 officers) and injuring 28. The bombing took place on Faisalabad Road, where a motorcycle loaded with explosives rammed the bus and triggered the blast. All the officers were new recruits posted to PAFB Mushaf for training. 

This was the last major attack before the 2007 state of emergency was imposed on the country.

See also
List of Pakistan Air Force Bases

References

Pakistan Air Force bases
Military installations in Punjab, Pakistan